Tales from Gavagan's Bar is a collection of fantasy short stories by American writers L. Sprague de Camp and Fletcher Pratt, illustrated by the latter's wife Inga Pratt. It was first published in hardcover by Twayne Publishers in 1953; an expanded edition rearranging the contents and adding pieces not in the first was published in hardcover by Owlswick Press in June 1978. The original illustrations were retained in this edition. It was subsequently issued in paperback (without the illustrations) by Bantam Books in January 1980. An e-book edition was published by Gollancz's SF Gateway imprint on September 29, 2011 as part of a general release of de Camp's works in electronic form. The collection has also been published in German.

Most of the pieces were originally published between 1950 and 1954, twelve in The Magazine of Fantasy & Science Fiction, three in Weird Tales, and eleven in the first edition of the collection; two additional tales subsequently appeared in Fantastic Universe in 1959, and one more, together with a new afterword, in the expanded edition of the collection in 1978.

The Gavagan's Bar stories fall into the genre of barroom tall tales, though in this instance most of the tall tales turn out to be true, or at least possibly true. The authors patterned them after Lord Dunsany's Jorkens stories.

Contents

Continuations
According to de Camp, he and Pratt envisioned at least one more Gavagan's Bar story, about a vampire with a sweet tooth, which was never written due to Pratt's early death.

While L. Sprague de Camp never continued the series on his own, an additional Gavagan's Bar story authored by Michael F. Flynn, "The Ensorcelled ATM", appeared in Harry Turtledove's 2005 tribute anthology honoring de Camp, The Enchanter Completed. It ties the series in with de Camp's later W. Wilson Newbury stories.

Critical reception
Reviewing the original edition for Galaxy, Groff Conklin described the stories as "completely enchanting—wise, mad, fantastic, funny, warmly human and often very moving." P. Schuyler Miller compared the stories to Lord Dunsany's "Jorkens" tales.

References

1953 short story collections
Fantasy short story collections by L. Sprague de Camp
Gavagan's Bar
Literary collaborations
Tall tales
Works by Fletcher Pratt